Hermann tom Ring (2 January 1521, in Münster – 18 October 1596, in Münster), was a German renaissance painter.

Biography
He was the pupil of his father, Ludger tom Ring the Elder. His brother, Ludger tom Ring the Younger, was also a painter. He spent his journeyman years in the Netherlands and returned to Münster, around 1544 at the latest, and created his first known work; a self-portrait. All of his subsequent works were done for the local Catholic churches.

From 1556, he was the Second Master of the Painters' Guild and served as Master from 1569 to 1597. In addition to paintings, he designed chimneys, gables and various carvings. He also created the wings of the High Altar and paintings of the Evangelists at the Überwasserkirche.

References

External links
 
 
Hermann tom Ring on Artnet

1521 births
1596 deaths
16th-century German painters
German male painters
People from Münster
Sibling artists